Cyrillic Extended-A is a Unicode block containing combining Cyrillic letters used in Old Church Slavonic texts.

Block

History
The following Unicode-related documents record the purpose and process of defining specific characters in the Cyrillic Extended-A block:

References 

Unicode blocks